Rob Astbury (1948 – 9 November 2017) was an Australian radio and television sports journalist and real estate agent.

Biography
Astbury was born in Avoca, Victoria. During a media career spanning 21 years, he won ten VFL/AFL awards, two national Penguin Awards and was twice nominated for the Logie Awards for the Best News Story of the year. After an early career in Melbourne radio, Astbury made a successful jump to television—firstly for the Channel 0/10 network, then for the Nine Network, after accepting a personal job offer from owner Kerry Packer. During his television career, Astbury was Australia's highest-paid sports correspondent.

In 2005, Astbury revealed he was HIV positive, although medical tests showed he was a rare long-term nonprogressor (or "elite controller"), whose body can suppress the virus for a long period without antiretroviral drugs. In 2006, celebrity agent Anthony Zammit published King and I: My Life With Graham Kennedy, a biography that detailed Astbury's relationship with entertainer Graham Kennedy. 
 
After retiring from television, Astbury worked as a real estate agent at Broadbeach on the Gold Coast, Queensland between 1995 and 2000. For the next decade he ran a property development company in Thailand. During the 2004 Boxing Day tsunami while Astbury was holidaying in Phuket, he reported on the devastation for the political website Crikey. Returning to the Gold Coast in 2010, Astbury worked with the Ray White Real Estate agency in Broadbeach. On 9 November 2017, a colleague found him dead in his home after he did not turn up to work and could not be contacted.

References

External links
 

1948 births
2017 deaths
Australian sports journalists
Australian television presenters
Australian LGBT journalists
AIDS-related deaths in Australia
Journalists from Victoria (Australia)